The 2017–18 Adelaide United W-League was the club's tenth season in the W-League, the premier competition for women's football in Australia. The team played home games at Marden Sports Complex and was managed by Ivan Karlović.

Players

Squad information

Transfers in

Transfers out

Contract extensions

Managerial staff

Squad statistics

Competitions

W-League

League table

Results summary

Results by round

Fixtures
 Click here for season fixtures.

References

Adelaide United FC (A-League Women) seasons
Adelaide United